"The Owl"  is a German fairy tale collected by the Brothers Grimm in Grimm's Fairy Tales, number 174.

It is Aarne-Thompson type 1281, Burning the Barn to Destroy an Unknown Animal.

Synopsis
In the story, a horned owl flies into a barn owned by a local at the nearby town. The owl quickly frightens all of the townspeople who try to enter the barn. The same day, a man known for his courage and bravery in warlike skills announces to the populace that they are "all acting like women". He then ventures into the barn with a spear.  The owl hoots at him, and he flees in terror.  The townspeople finally come up with the decision to burn the barn down and be rid of the owl forever.

References

Owl
Owl
ATU 1200-1349